The 1998 Independence Bowl was a college football postseason bowl game between the Ole Miss Rebels and the Texas Tech Red Raiders.

Background

The Rebels had plummeted to fourth in the SEC West after losing their last three games, including one to Mississippi State in the Egg Bowl. Tuberville left the team prior to the bowl game for Auburn, leaving the coaching duties to David Cutcliffe, hired on December 2. Meanwhile, the Red Raiders were third in the Big 12 South Division after losing four of their last five games. This was the first Independence Bowl for both teams since 1986, which Mississippi won, 20-17. This was the first Independence Bowl featuring a Big 12 team, and the first to be sponsored by Sanford, a leading manufacturer and marketer of writing instruments.

Game summary

First quarter
Texas Tech: Dorris 22 pass from Peters (Birkholz kick) – 7–0 Texas Tech
Ole Miss: Lucas 33 pass from Miller (McGee kick) – 7–7 tie

Second quarter
Ole Miss: McAllister 32 pass from Miller (McGee kick) – 14–7 Ole Miss
Texas Tech: Birkholz 49 field goal – 14–10 Ole Miss

Fourth quarter
Ole Miss: Peterson 26 pass from Miller (McGee kick) – 21–10 Ole Miss
Ole Miss: McAllister 4 run (McGee kick) – 28–10 Ole Miss
Ole Miss: McAllister 43 kickoff return (McGee kick) – 35–10 Ole Miss
Texas Tech: McCullar fumble recovery for a touchdown (Winn pass) – 35–18 Ole Miss

Aftermath
The Rebels returned to the Independence Bowl the following year. The Red Raiders haven't returned to the Independence Bowl since this game.

In an adjacent development, Tuberville would end up coaching Texas Tech from 2010−12.

Statistics

References

Independence Bowl
Independence Bowl
Texas Tech Red Raiders football bowl games
Ole Miss Rebels football bowl games
December 1998 sports events in the United States
1998 in sports in Louisiana